Colette Richarme (born 24 January 1904 in Canton (Guangzhou), China, died in Montpellier, 27 February 1991) was a French painter.

Biography 
Richarme spent her childhood in China. Her mother, familiar with art, taught her to observe her surroundings and to draw from an early age. The sudden death of her father, a silk trader for a British firm, forced mother and daughter to return to France just before the First World War. They lived in Lyon and Albertville, where Richarme married in 1926. The couple's move to Paris in 1935 provided access to the workshops of the Académie de la Grande Chaumière where Richarme was a classmate of Louise Bourgeois. But it was in Montpellier that she really began her career as an artist, presenting her first solo exhibition in 1941. After the war, she maintained regular contact with Paris (exhibitions, annual salons) while actively participating in regional artistic life. Until the end of her life she continued her research in  her Languedoc studio.

Exhibitions

Solo exhibitions
 In Paris: Galeries Bruno Bassano, Jacob, 55, Arlette Chabaud, la Roue, Rond-Point des Champs Élysées, Freddy Noël, Danièle Drouant
 In Montpellier: In her lifetime, exhibitions every 2 years between 1941 and 1989
 In regions: Albertville, Avignon, Bagnols-sur-Cèze, Béziers, Cannes, Grasse, Lyon, Nîmes, Perpignan, Pont-Saint-Esprit, Sète, Villeneuve-lez-Avignon

Group exhibitions
 Paris salons: Les Artistes Français, Salon d'Automne, Société nationale des beaux-arts, les Indépendants, Société de dessin de l'école française
 In Paris: Galerie Welter, Galerie de l'ouest, Galerie Besnard, Galerie Christiane Vincent
 In regions: Angers, Antibes, Avignon, Bédarieux, Bonnieux, Bourges, Cannes, Castres, Cavaillon, Céret, Châteauneuf-du-Pape, Clermont-Ferrand, Dijon, Évian, Fontaine-de-Vaucluse, Grandvilliers, Juvisy-sur-Orge, La Grange de Meslay, Lamalou-les-Bains, Lavérune, L'Isle-sur-Sorgues, Lyon, Macon, Menton, Montauban, Montélimar, Montpellier, Narbonne, Nice, Nyons, Orange, Sète, Toulouse, Vaison-la-Romaine, Valréas, Vichy, Villefranche-sur-Mer, Villeneuve-lez-Avignon.

Publications
 Oscar Wilde, Salomé, illustrated by Richarme, Montpellier, les Cent Regards, 2010
 Richarme, La danse, Montpellier, les Cent Regards, 2011
 Richarme, Équivalences plastiques, 9 poèmes de Stéphane Mallarmé, Montpellier, les Cent Regards, 2011
 Richarme, Oradour, Montpellier, les Cent regards, 2011
 Richarme, Savoie, Dessins, gouaches et huiles 1920-1987, Montpellier, les Cent Regards, 2012
 Richarme, Léda, Montpellier, les Cent Regards, 2015

References

 Dictionnaire critique et documentaire des peintres, sculpteurs, dessinateurs et graveurs de tous les temps et de tous les pays par un groupe d'écrivains spécialistes français et étrangers, Bénézit, Oxford University Press, 2011
 Dictionnaire de biographie héraultaise, Pierre Clerc et al., Nouvelles Presses du Languedoc, 2006 et 2009

Bibliography
 Richarme, Monographie, text by Robert Briatte, Jean-Louis Gourg, Max Rouquette, Lodève, La Jonque, 1984
 Richarme, Journal d’atelier suivi de Parcours d’artiste by Bernard Derrieu, Pézenas, Domens, 2000
 Richarme, Invitation à la mer, texts and gouaches selected and presented by Estelle Goutorbe, Marseille, Jeanne Lafitte, 2003
 Colette Richarme, une artiste, une vie, une œuvre, Jean-Luc Bourges, Albertville, musée, 2007
 Le Gard vu par les peintres, Frédéric Gaussen, Marseille, éditions Gaussen, 2009
 Richarme, au-delà du blanc, Françoise Renaud, Condom, C.L.C. Éditions, 2010
 L’Hérault vu par les peintres, Alain Laborieux et Robert Faure, Marseille, éditions Gaussen, 2012

External links 

 Official website

1904 births
1991 deaths
20th-century French women artists
French women painters
French contemporary artists
Artists from Guangzhou
French expatriates in China